The 2019 Fuzhou China Open was a badminton tournament which took place at Haixia Olympics Sports Center in Fuzhou, Fujian, China, from 5 to 10 November 2019 and had a total prize of $700,000.

Tournament
The 2019 Fuzhou China Open was the twenty-third tournament of the 2019 BWF World Tour and also part of the Fuzhou China Open championships, which has been held since 2005. This tournament was organized by Chinese Badminton Association and sanctioned by the BWF.

Venue
This international tournament was held at Haixia Olympic Sports Center in Fuzhou, Fujian, China.

Point distribution
Below is the point distribution table for each phase of the tournament based on the BWF points system for the BWF World Tour Super 750 event.

Prize money
The total prize money for this tournament was US$700,000. Distribution of prize money was in accordance with BWF regulations.

Men's singles

Seeds

 Kento Momota (champion)
 Chou Tien-chen (final)
 Shi Yuqi (second round)
 Anders Antonsen (semi-finals)
 Chen Long (second round)
 Jonatan Christie (quarter-finals)
 Viktor Axelsen (quarter-finals)
 Anthony Sinisuka Ginting (first round)

Finals

Top half

Section 1

Section 2

Bottom half

Section 3

Section 4

Women's singles

Seeds

 Tai Tzu-ying (semi-finals)
 Akane Yamaguchi (first round)
 Chen Yufei (champion)
 Nozomi Okuhara (final)
 Ratchanok Intanon (quarter-finals)
 P. V. Sindhu (first round)
 He Bingjiao (quarter-finals)
 Saina Nehwal (first round)

Finals

Top half

Section 1

Section 2

Bottom half

Section 3

Section 4

Men's doubles

Seeds

 Marcus Fernaldi Gideon / Kevin Sanjaya Sukamuljo (champions)
 Mohammad Ahsan / Hendra Setiawan (quarter-finals)
 Li Junhui / Liu Yuchen (quarter-finals)
 Takeshi Kamura / Keigo Sonoda (final)
 Fajar Alfian / Muhammad Rian Ardianto (second round)
 Hiroyuki Endo / Yuta Watanabe (second round)
 Han Chengkai / Zhou Haodong (second round)
 Kim Astrup / Anders Skaarup Rasmussen (first round)

Finals

Top half

Section 1

Section 2

Bottom half

Section 3

Section 4

Women's doubles

Seeds

 Mayu Matsumoto / Wakana Nagahara (semi-finals)
 Yuki Fukushima / Sayaka Hirota (champions)
 Chen Qingchen / Jia Yifan (semi-finals)
 Misaki Matsutomo / Ayaka Takahashi (second round)
 Lee So-hee / Shin Seung-chan (final)
 Greysia Polii / Apriyani Rahayu (first round)
 Du Yue / Li Yinhui (second round)
 Kim So-yeong / Kong Hee-yong (quarter-finals)

Finals

Top half

Section 1

Section 2

Bottom half

Section 3

Section 4

Mixed doubles

Seeds

 Zheng Siwei / Huang Yaqiong (final)
 Wang Yilü / Huang Dongping (champions)
 Dechapol Puavaranukroh / Sapsiree Taerattanachai (quarter-finals)
 Yuta Watanabe / Arisa Higashino (semi-finals)
 Seo Seung-jae / Chae Yoo-jung (quarter-finals)
 Chan Peng Soon / Goh Liu Ying (quarter-finals)
 Praveen Jordan / Melati Daeva Oktavianti (quarter-finals)
 Marcus Ellis / Lauren Smith (first round)

Finals

Top half

Section 1

Section 2

Bottom half

Section 3

Section 4

References

External links
 Tournament Link

China Masters
Fuzhou China Open
Fuzhou China Open
Fuzhou China Open